Goodnight Goodnight or Goodnight and Goodnight may refer to:

In music:
 "Goodnight Goodnight" (Hot Hot Heat song), 2005
 "Goodnight Goodnight" (Maroon 5 song), 2008

In taxonomy:
The publications and described taxa of zoologist Clarence J. Goodnight and Marie L. Goodnight